Alfredo Campagner (11 October 1920-15 October 2016) was an Italian high jumper, who won eight national championships at individual senior level from 1940 to 1951.

Biography 
His best result at international senior level was the 6th place at the 1946 European Athletics Championships held in Oslo, Norway.

National records
 High jump: 1.98 m (Parma, 14 June 1942). holder for 14 years.

Top 25 world lists

Achievements

National titles
 Italian Athletics Championships
 High jump: 1940, 1941, 1942, 1943, 1945, 1046, 1947, 1951 (8)

See also
 Men's high jump Italian record progression

References

External links
 

1920 births
2016 deaths
Italian male high jumpers
People from Schio
Sportspeople from the Province of Vicenza